Julia Weldon (born April 22, 1983) is an American indie singer and actor.

Early life
Weldon spent most of their childhood living in Demarest, New Jersey. They were a child actor. They attended Demarest Schools, where they played sports, especially softball, and acted. They graduated from Vassar College in 2005 with a major in Philosophy.

Career
Weldon, a self-taught musician, released their first album, Light is a Ghost, in 2013.

In November 2015, Weldon underwent gender-affirming surgery and unexpectedly fell into a coma for four days, possibly due to meningitis. They returned to recording in September 2016 with the album Comatose Hope.

Personal life
Weldon is non-binary and uses they/them pronouns.

Albums
Light is a Ghost (2013)
Comatose Hope (2018)

Filmography

 High Maintenance (2018)
 Prom King, 2010 (2017) (Jules)
 Law & Order: Special Victims Unit (2005) (Pamela Sawyer)
 Law & Order (1998) (Sally Maxwell)
 Before and After (1996) (Judith Ryan)
 Parallel Sons (1995) (Sally Carlson)

References

External links
 

Living people
American film actors
Non-binary singers
Queer singers
Singers from New Jersey
American television actors
Actors from New Jersey
American LGBT songwriters
American indie pop musicians
People from Demarest, New Jersey
American LGBT singers
Queer actors
Vassar College alumni
Non-binary songwriters
Queer songwriters
LGBT people from New Jersey
American child actors
1983 births
21st-century American singers
American non-binary actors
American non-binary writers